Panorama Point is the highest natural point in Nebraska, at an elevation of  above sea level.
It is located in southwestern Kimball County, near the point where Nebraska and Wyoming meet on Colorado's northern boundary. Despite its name and elevation, Panorama Point is not a mountain or a hill; it is merely a low rise on the High Plains. From the point one can see the nearby state corner marker, and a vast plains landscape with the Rocky Mountains in the western distance. Panorama Point is located on the High Point Bison Ranch, which permits visitors to drive to the site as long as they take care to avoid the ranging bison and pay an entrance fee.

See also
 
 
 List of U.S. states by elevation

References

External links
 
 

Geography of Nebraska
Geography of Kimball County, Nebraska
Tourist attractions in Kimball County, Nebraska
Highest points of U.S. states